The Danish pile-driving formula is a formula which enables one to have a good gauge of the bearing capacity of a driven pile.

History

The formula was constructed by the Danish civil engineer Andreas Knudsen in 1955. It was made as a part of his final project at The Technical University of Denmark and was published for the Geotechnic Congress in London in 1956. Later it became part of the Danish Code of Practice for Foundation Engineering and was named.

The formula

in which

where

 Qdy = ultimate dynamic bearing capacity of driven pile
 α = pile driving hammer efficiency
 WH = weight of hammer
 H = hammer drop
 S = inelastic set of piles, in distance pr. hammer blow
 Se = elastic set of piles, in distance pr. hammer blow
 L = pile length
 A = pile end area
 E = modulus of elasticity of pile material

References 
 Dansk standard  DS/EN 1997-1, 2. udgave, 2007-06-22

Journal of the Soil Mechanics and Foundation Division, November 1967

The Influence of Time on the Bearing capacity of Driven Piles

External links 
  – The Danish Code of Practice – homepage.

Equations